Sterope (Ancient Greek: Στερόπη, from , steropē, lightning) was the name of several individuals in Greek mythology:

 Sterope (or Asterope), one of the Pleiades and the wife of Oenomaus (or his mother by Ares).
 Sterope, a Pleuronian princess as the daughter of King Pleuron and Xanthippe. She was the sister of Agenor, Stratonice and Laophonte.
 Sterope, a Calydonian princess as the daughter of King Porthaon and Euryte or Laothoe. She was the sister of Oeneus, Agrius, Melas, Leucopeus, Stratonice and Eurythemiste. Sterope was sometimes said to be the mother of the Sirens by Achelous.
Sterope, an Arcadian princess as the daughter of Cepheus, king of Tegea.
 Sterope, a princess of Iolcus as the daughter of King Acastus by either Astydameia or Hippolyte.
 Sterope, daughter of Helios and wife of King Eurypylus of Cyrene by whom she became the mother of Lycaon and Leucippus.
 Sterope, one of the Maenads. She followed Dionysus during the god's Indian campaign but was slain by Morrheus.
 Sterope, one of the horses of Helios.

Sterope is also the name of one of the stars in the Pleiades star cluster.

Notes

References 

 Apollodorus, The Library with an English Translation by Sir James George Frazer, F.B.A., F.R.S. in 2 Volumes, Cambridge, MA, Harvard University Press; London, William Heinemann Ltd. 1921. ISBN 0-674-99135-4. Online version at the Perseus Digital Library. Greek text available from the same website.
Gaius Julius Hyginus, Fabulae from The Myths of Hyginus translated and edited by Mary Grant. University of Kansas Publications in Humanistic Studies. Online version at the Topos Text Project.
 Hesiod, Catalogue of Women from Homeric Hymns, Epic Cycle, Homerica translated by Evelyn-White, H G. Loeb Classical Library Volume 57. London: William Heinemann, 1914. Online version at theio.com
 .
Nonnus of Panopolis, Dionysiaca translated by William Henry Denham Rouse (1863-1950), from the Loeb Classical Library, Cambridge, MA, Harvard University Press, 1940.  Online version at the Topos Text Project.
 Nonnus of Panopolis, Dionysiaca. 3 Vols. W.H.D. Rouse. Cambridge, MA., Harvard University Press; London, William Heinemann, Ltd. 1940–1942. Greek text available at the Perseus Digital Library.

Princesses in Greek mythology
Maenads
Companions of Dionysus
Aetolian characters in Greek mythology
Characters from Iolcus
Children of Helios